Pig is a 2018 Iranian comedy film directed by Mani Haghighi. It was selected to compete for the Golden Bear in the main competition section at the 68th Berlin International Film Festival.

Plot
A film director is blacklisted and is barred from directing films, forcing him to go into directing commercials. His actress leaves him to pursue a career with other actors. Whilst this is occurring, film directors are being killed off one by one, with their heads severed and the word 'pig' imprinted on their foreheads. The film director wonders why the serial killer didn't come after him.

Cast
 Hassan Majooni
 Leila Hatami
 Leili Rashidi
 Parinaz Izadyar
 Ali Mosaffa
 Meena Jafarzadeh
 Ainaz Azarhoush
 Soheila Razavi
 Siamak Ansari
 Mahnaz Afshar as herself
 Payman Maadi as himself
 Vishka Asayesh as herself
 Saber Abar as himself

References

External links
 

2018 films
2018 comedy films
Iranian comedy films
2010s Persian-language films
Films directed by Mani Haghighi